Adesh Kanwarjit Singh Brar (1949 - 2012) was an Indian farmer, politician and Congress MLA from the Punjab state of India. He was the son of former Chief Minister of Punjab, Harcharan Singh Brar. He completed his schooling from The Doon School (1957). Became an MLA in 1977, 2007 respectively.

Personal life 
Adesh Kanwarjit Singh Brar was born on 15 October 1949 in Amritsar, East Punjab, Union of India into a Punjabi Jatt Sikh family of the Brar Sidhu clan to parents Harcharan Singh Brar (1922-2009) and Gurbrinder Kaur Brar (1922-2013). An alumnus of The Doon School, he married his wife Karan Kaur Brar and has 3 sons, the eldest of whom is Tegbir Singh Brar, who manages the family's horse-breeding farm, Dashmesh Stud in Punjab.

Death 
Brar died at his home in New Delhi on 4 March 2012 after a long fight with cancer at the age of 63 years. He was cremated at his Native village Sarai Naga, Sri Muktsar Sahib.

References

1949 births
2012 deaths
Indian politicians
Punjab, India politicians
Indian National Congress politicians from Punjab, India
The Doon School alumni
Punjab, India MLAs 1992–1997